The Department of Orang Asli Development, abbreviated JAKOA, is the Malaysian government agency entrusted to oversee the affairs of the Orang Asli. This body is under the Malaysian Ministry of Rural Development and was first set up in 1954.

History 

During the Malayan Emergency of 1948 to 1960, the Orang Asli became a vital component of national security, as with their help, the Malayan army was able to defeat the communist insurgents. Two administrative initiatives were introduced to highlight the importance of Orang Asli as well to protect its identity. The initiatives were the establishment of the Department of Aborigines in 1950 and the enactment of the Aboriginal Peoples Ordinance in 1954. After independence, the development of Orang Asli become the prime objective of the government, where the government adopted a policy in 1961 to integrate the Orang Asli into the wider Malaysian society.

Among the stated objectives of the department are to eradicate poverty among the Orang Asli, improving their health, promoting education, and improving their general livelihood. There is a high incidence of poverty among the Orang Asli. In 1997, 80% of all Orang Asli lived below the poverty line. This ratio is extremely high compared to the national poverty rate of 8.5% at that time.

The Orang Asli are theoretically classified as Bumiputras, a status signifying indigenity to Malaysia which carries certain social, economic, and political rights, along with the Malays and the natives of Sabah and Sarawak. However, this status is generally not mentioned in the constitution.

Some legislations which concerns Orang Asli are the National Land Code 1965, Land Conservation Act 1960, Protection of Wildlife Act 1972, National Parks Act 1980, and most importantly the Aboriginal Peoples Act 1954. The Aboriginal Peoples Act 1954 provides for the setting up and establishment of the Orang Asli Reserve Land. However, the Act also includes the power accorded to the Director-General of the JHEOA to order Orang Asli out of such reserved land at its discretion and awards compensation to affected people, also at its discretion.

A landmark case on this matter is in the 2002 case of Sagong bin Tasi & Ors v Kerajaan Negeri Selangor. The case was concerned with the state using its powers conferred under the 1954 Act to evict Orang Asli from gazetted Orang Asli Reserve Land. The High Court ruled in favour of Sagong Tasi, who represented the Orang Asli, and this decision was upheld by the Court of Appeal.

The former Prime Minister of Malaysia, Dr. Mahathir Mohamad, made controversial remarks regarding the Orang Asli, saying that Orang Asli were not entitled to more rights than the Malays, even though they were natives to the land. He posted this on his blog comparing the Orang Asli in Malaysia to Native Americans in the United States, Maori in New Zealand, and Aborigines in Australia. He was criticised by spokespeople and advocates for the Orang Asli who said that the Orang Asli desired to be recognised as the natives of Malaysia and that his statement would expose their land to businessmen and loggers.

On 1 May 2018, Ajis Sitin from the Semai tribe, became the first Orang Asli to be appointed Director-General.

On 14 September 2021, Sapiah Mohd Nor, Chief of Enforcement Management in the Ministry of Domestic Trade and Consumer Affairs (KPDNHEP) and the sister of Member of Parliament (MP) for Cameron Highlands Ramli Mohd Nor became the first Orang Asli woman appointed as JAKOA Director-General.

References

External links
 

Government agencies established in 1954
1954 establishments in Malaya
Indigenous affairs ministries
Federal ministries, departments and agencies of Malaysia
Ministry of Rural Development (Malaysia)